Marine energy management is the application of systematic methods to measure, register and analyze the energy usage of oceangoing vessels in specific.  

The goal of marine energy management is to 
maximize the (electrical or mechanical) energy generated from the minimum amount of fossil fuel, and 
maximize the useful work obtained from the minimum amount of generated energy.  The IMO is the international body responsible for code regulation.
These are two separated optimization problems.

Marine energy management can both be applied on board and onshore.  It is a complex problem, due to the number of inter-related energy systems on board vessels, such as the propulsion, the auxiliary engines, refrigeration systems, HVAC, etc.  The weather and sea-state, plus the logistics involved in transporting goods from one port to another, also have big effects.  

Marine energy management can be addressed on board through measuring devices, monitoring systems and decision-support systems.  It can be addressed onshore through data analysis, leading to change in operation on board.

See also
Fuel efficiency
Energy Engineering
Marine fuel management

External links
Alaris Companies
DNV - Energy Management
International Maritime Organization
Lloyd's Register
Marine Energy Management Forum
Marorka - Marine Energy Management Solutions

Energy conservation
Environmental impact of shipping